Pape Bouna Thiaw (born 5 February 1981) is a Senegalese professional football coach and a former player who played as a forward. He is the manager of the Senegal A' national team.

Playing career
He played for several clubs, including Lausanne-Sport in Switzerland, Racing Strasbourg in France. and CF Atlético Ciudad in Spain.

He played for Senegal national football team and was a participant at the 2002 FIFA World Cup.

Coaching career
Thiaw was the manager of the Senegal A' national team that won the 2022 African Nations Championship. African Nations Championship limits the squads to players from the domestic league. The main Senegal squad that participates in the FIFA World Cup and Africa Cup of Nations and includes players from the foreign clubs is managed by Aliou Cissé.

References

External links 
 
 

1981 births
Living people
French sportspeople of Senegalese descent
Footballers from Dakar
Association football forwards
Senegalese footballers
Senegalese expatriate footballers
Senegal international footballers
Swiss Super League players
Ligue 1 players
Ligue 2 players
Russian Premier League players
La Liga players
SR Delémont players
AS Saint-Étienne players
FC Istres players
RC Strasbourg Alsace players
FC Metz players
FC Lausanne-Sport players
FC Dynamo Moscow players
Deportivo Alavés players
Lorca Deportiva CF footballers
US Créteil-Lusitanos players
2002 FIFA World Cup players
2002 African Cup of Nations players
Expatriate footballers in Spain
Expatriate footballers in Russia
Expatriate footballers in Switzerland
Senegalese football managers
Senegal national football team managers